The 1990–91 Eastern Michigan Hurons men's basketball team represented Eastern Michigan University during the 1990–91 NCAA Division I men's basketball season. The Hurons, led by head coach Ben Braun, played their home games at Bowen Field House and were members of the Mid-American Conference. They finished the season 26–7, 13–3 in MAC play. They were MAC Regular season and MAC tournament champions, and received an automatic bid to the NCAA tournament as No. 12 seed in the East region. The Hurons made a run to the Sweet Sixteen, defeating Mississippi State and Penn State before falling to No. 1 seed North Carolina in the East regional semifinals.

A Sweet 16 Reunion was held February 12, 2011 to honor the 1990–91 team.

Roster

Source:

Schedule and results 

|-
!colspan=9 style=| Regular season

|-
!colspan=9 style=| MAC tournament

|-
!colspan=9 style=| NCAA tournament

Awards and honors
Marcus Kennedy – MAC Player of the Year
Ben Braun – MAC Coach of the Year

NBA draft

References

Eastern Michigan Eagles men's basketball seasons
Eastern Michigan
Eastern Michigan
Eastern Michigan Eagles Men's Basketball
Eastern Michigan Eagles Men's Basketball